Ladda ibhara is a species of butterfly in the family Hesperiidae. It is found in Venezuela, Ecuador, Bolivia, Peru and Brazil.

References

Butterflies described in 1870
Hesperiidae of South America
Taxa named by Arthur Gardiner Butler